"Homesick" is the first single by Welsh indie rock band Catfish and the Bottlemen. The song was included in their EP, Kathleen and the Other Three, and their debut studio album, The Balcony. The single was released on 18 May 2013 and reached 182 on the UK Singles Chart.

Music video 
The music video is a slideshow with split-second black-and-white photos of the band preparing for a concert and performing a concert. The music video was directed by Jon Stone, using photos by Jordan Curtis Hughes. The music video came out on 17 April 2015.

Track listing

Charts

Certifications

References

External links 
Homesick - Single at Discogs

2013 singles
2013 songs
Catfish and the Bottlemen songs
Island Records singles
Song recordings produced by Jim Abbiss